is a Japanese ski jumper. She has competed at World Cup level since the 2014/15 season, with her best individual result being fourth place in Oberstdorf on 25 March 2018. Her younger sister Rio Setō has also competed at World Cup level.

Representing the Japanese national team, Yūka won a bronze medal in the women's team competition at the 2015 Junior World Championships in Almaty. She also won the first ever women's World Cup team competition in Hinterzarten on 16 December 2017, with her team-mates Yuki Ito, Kaori Iwabuchi, and Sara Takanashi.

References

1997 births
Living people
Sportspeople from Hokkaido
Japanese female ski jumpers
Ski jumpers at the 2018 Winter Olympics
Ski jumpers at the 2022 Winter Olympics
Olympic ski jumpers of Japan
20th-century Japanese women
21st-century Japanese women